Alexăndrel or Alexăndru II (1429 – 25 May 1455), son of Iliaș of Moldavia, was the prince (or voivode) of Moldavia in 1449, from 1452 to 1454, and in 1455.

Life 
He preferred the alliance with the Polish–Lithuanian Commonwealth, in contrast with Peter III of Moldavia, who was protégé of John Hunyadi, Governor of Hungary. The influence of Hungary weakened after the Ottomans defeated Hunyadi's army in the second Battle of Kosovo in October 1448. With the support of boyars who preferred an alliance with the Commonwealth, Alexăndrel expelled Peter III from Moldavia and seized the throne in February 1449. He confirmed the privileges of the merchants of Brașov. According to the Moldavian-Polish chronicle, Alexăndrel also ceded Chilia (now Kiliya in Ukraine) to Hungary, but two other Moldavian chronicles attribute the same act to his predecessor. In October 1449, Hunyadi's other protégé, Bogdan II broke into Moldavia, forcing Alexăndrel to flee.

After Bogdan was murdered, Alexăndrel and Petru Aron divided Moldavia among themselves. Alexăndrel took control of southern Moldavia. He united Moldavia with the support of Hunyadi. He signed a treaty with Hunyadi on 16 February 1453, recognizing him as the protector of Moldavia. Petru Aaron expelled him from Moldavia in March or May 1455.

References

Sources

External links

Rulers of Moldavia